Gazette des armes is a French monthly magazine focusing primarily on antique firearms collecting.  It was founded in 1972 by Jean-Jaques Bugnes, president of the Union Francaise des amateurs d'Armes.  The quality of its articles makes Gazettes des Armes the reference for all collectors .  Eleven issues are published each year plus 1 or 2 special issues.  It has had several editors since it was first published.

External links
Official web site of Gazette des Armes with an index of articles published

1972 establishments in France
French-language magazines
Magazines established in 1972
Military magazines published in France
Monthly magazines published in France